Zygmunt Muchniewski (30 July 1896 – 5 January 1979) was a Polish politician who headed the Christian Democratic Party and was the prime minister of the Polish Government in Exile from 16 July 1970 to 13 July 1972.

1896 births
1979 deaths
Polish emigrants to the United Kingdom